José Luis Martín Descalzo (1930–1991) was a Spanish priest, journalist and writer. A prolific author, he published more than 50 books in a wide range of genres - novels, short stories, plays, poetry, as well as numerous volumes of essays. He won the Premio Nadal for his novel La frontera de Dios.

Works

Novels
 El hombre que no sabía pecar (as Martín Azcárate)
 Diálogo para cuatro muertos (Oviedo, 1953)
 La frontera de Dios (1956)
 Lobos, perros y corderos (1978)
 El demonio de media tarde (1982)

Non-fiction
 Un periodista en el concilio, 1962-1965
 Razones para la esperanza (1984)
 Un cura se confiesa (1955)
 Siempre es Viernes Santo
 Razones para la alegría
 Razones para el amor
 Razones para vivir
 Razones desde la otra orilla
 Razones para la esperanza
 Las razones de su vida
 Vida y misterio de Jesús de Nazaret
I. Los comienzos
II. El mensaje
III. La cruz y la gloria
 Apócrifo de María
 Por un mundo menos malo
 Jesucristo (Edit. Urbión, seven volumes)
 El verdadero rostro de María Rafols
 El sermón de las siete palabras 
 Tarancón , el cardenal del cambio 
 Reconciliación entre españoles 
 El misterio de la caridad de Juana de Arco 
 Folletos de Mundo Cristiano 
 El Concilio de Juan y Pablo 
 La Iglesia, nuestra hija 
 Reflexiones de un enfermo en torno al dolor 
 Las razones de su vida

Verse
 Fábulas con Dios al fondo (1957)
 Camino de la cruz (1959)
 Querido mundo terrible (1970)
 Apócrifo (1975)
 Apócrifo del domingo (1982)

Plays
 La hoguera feliz (1962)
 A dos barajas (1972)
 Godspell (1974), translation
 El segundo juicio de Galileo (1978)
 Fuenteovejuna, by Lope de Vega
 Las prostitutas os precederán en el reino de los cielos (1986)
 El peregrino (2001)

Stories
 Paco y su gata
 San José García
 Dios es alegre

Other
 Testamento del pájaro solitario
Fábulas con Dios de fondo
Lo que María guardaba en su corazón
Diálogos de pasión
El joven Dios
Fragmentos de una confesión
Nacido de mujer

Selected works in English
A Priest Confesses, translated into English by Rita Goldberg, ed. Mairin Mitchell (The Catholic Book Club, 1962)

References

20th-century Spanish writers
20th-century Spanish journalists
Spanish priests
1930 births
1991 deaths